Inaros may refer to:

People
 Inaros I (fl. c. 665 BC), ancient Egyptian prince
 Inaros II (fl. c. 460 BC), ancient Egyptian prince

Fictional characters
 Marco Inaros and Filip Inaros, fictional characters in The Expanse novel series
 Inaros, a character played by Roger Cudney in the 1988 film Deathstalker and the Warriors from Hell
 Inaros, a playable character in the online game Warframe